Carhuallún is a mountain located in the Cordillera Blanca mountain range, west of Santa Cruz, within Huascarán National Park.

References 

Mountains of Peru
Mountains of Ancash Region
Huascarán National Park